The 2010 Big South Conference baseball tournament  was the postseason baseball tournament for the Big South Conference, held from May 25 through 29 at Winthrop Ballpark, home field of Winthrop in Rock Hill, South Carolina.  The top eight teams participated in the double-elimination tournament. The champion, won the title for the eleventh time, and earned an invitation to the 2010 NCAA Division I baseball tournament.

Format
The top eight finishers from the round-robin regular season qualified for the tournament.  The teams were seeded one through eight based on conference winning percentage.  The bottom seeds played a single elimination play-in round, with the two winners joining the top four seeds in a six team double-elimination tournament.

High Point forfeited several games due to the use of an ineligible player.  The standings template at right reflects the results after the forfeits, while the table below shows the results of games played in order to accurately reflect seeding.

Bracket and results

Play-in round

Double-elimination rounds

All-Tournament Team

Most Valuable Player
Daniel Bowman was named Tournament Most Valuable Player.  Bowman was an outfielder for Coastal Carolina.

References

Tournament
Big South Conference Baseball Tournament
Big South baseball tournament
Big South Conference baseball tournament